May refer to the following grand princes of Moscow:

 Ivan I of Moscow (1288–1340 or 1341)
 Ivan II of Moscow (1326–1359)
Ivan III of Moscow (1440–1505)
 Ivan IV of Moscow (also known as Ivan the Terrible), first tsar of Russia (1530–1584)